The Scottish Affairs Select Committee is a select committee of the House of Commons in the Parliament of the United Kingdom. The remit of the committee is to examine the expenditure, administration and policy of the Office of the Secretary of State for Scotland (and prior to that, the Scottish Office), and relations with the Scottish Parliament. It also looks at the administration and expenditure of the Advocate General for Scotland.

Unlike the Scottish Grand Committee, MPs from constituencies outside Scotland can, and do, sit on the Scottish Affairs Committee.

Membership
Following the 2019 general election, the House of Commons appointed the members of the Scottish Affairs committee on 4 May 2020. As of February 2023 the membership is as follows:

Changes since 2019

2017-2019 Parliament
The election of the chair took place on 12 July 2017, with the members of the committee being announced on 11 September 2017.

Changes 2017-2019

2015-2017 Parliament
The chair was elected on 18 June 2015, with members being announced on 6 July 2015.

Changes 2015-2017

2010-2015 Parliament
The chair was elected on 10 June 2010, with members being announced on 12 July 2010.

Changes 2010-2015

List of chairs

See also
Parliamentary Committees of the United Kingdom

References

External links
Records of the Scottish Affairs Committee are held at the Parliamentary Archives
Scottish Affairs Committee

Politics of Scotland
Select Committees of the British House of Commons